The 196th New York State Legislature, consisting of the New York State Senate and the New York State Assembly, met from January 5, 2005, to December 31, 2006, during the eleventh and twelfth years of George Pataki's governorship, in Albany.

State Senate

Senators
The asterisk (*) denotes members of the previous Legislature who continued in office as members of this Legislature. Jeffrey D. Klein and George H. Winner Jr. changed from the Assembly to the Senate at the beginning of this legislature. Assemblywoman Catharine Young was elected to fill a vacancy in the Senate.

Note: For brevity, the chairmanships omit the words "...the Committee on (the)..."

Employees
 Secretary: ?

State Assembly

Assembly members
The asterisk (*) denotes members of the previous Legislature who continued in office as members of this Legislature.

Note: For brevity, the chairmanships omit the words "...the Committee on (the)..."

Employees
 Clerk: ?

References

Sources
 Senate election results at NYS Board of Elections
 Assembly election results at NYS Board of Elections

196
2005 politics in New York (state)
2006 politics in New York (state)
2005 U.S. legislative sessions
2006 U.S. legislative sessions